Alfred Corn (born August 14, 1943) is an American poet and essayist.

Early life 
Alfred Corn was born in Bainbridge, Georgia in 1943 and raised in Valdosta, Georgia.

Corn graduated from Emory University in 1965 with a B.A. in French literature and then earned an M.A. in French literature at Columbia University in 1967.

During the years 1967-1968 he traveled to Paris on a Fulbright Scholarship with his wife Ann Jones, whom he met three years earlier in France during a summer study program.
After he and Ann Jones divorced, he was partnered with the architect Walter Brown in the years 1971–1976 and then with J.D. McClatchy from 1977 until 1989.

Career 

His first book of poems, All Roads at Once, appeared in 1976, followed by A Call in the Midst of the Crowd (1978), The Various Light (1980), Notes from a Child of Paradise (1984), The West Door (1988), Autobiographies (1992). His seventh book of poems, titled Present, appeared in 1997, along with a novel titled Part of His Story., and a study of prosody, The Poem’s Heartbeat (Story Line Press, 1997; Copper Canyon Press, 2008).  Stake: Selected Poems, 1972–1992, appeared in 1999, followed by Contradictions in 2002. He has also published a collection of critical essays titled The Metamorphoses of Metaphor (1988) and a work of art criticism, Aaron Rose Photographs (Abrams Books, 2001).  In January 2013, Tables, a volume of poems, was published by Press53. In April 2014, Unions, a volume of poems, was published by Barrow Street Press.  In December 2014, Miranda's Book, a novel, was published by Eyewear Publishing in London, United Kingdom.

Corn was awarded the 1982 Levinson Prize by Poetry Magazine.

Corn received an Award in Literature from the Academy of Arts and Letters in 1983 and a Guggenheim Fellowship in 1986. In 1987, he was awarded a Fellowship of the Academy of American Poets.

Additional fellowships and prizes awarded for his poetry include the National Endowment for the Arts and a residency at The Bellagio Center for the Rockefeller Foundation.

Teaching 

For many years (1983–2001) he taught in the Graduate Writing Program of the Columbia University School of the Arts and has held visiting posts at UCLA, the City University of New York, the University of Cincinnati, Ohio State University, Oklahoma State University, Sarah Lawrence, Yale University, and the University of Tulsa.  As critic, he has written for The New York Times Book Review, The Nation, The Washington Post Book World, and The New Republic.  Beginning in 1989 and continuing to the present, he has published reviews and articles for Art in America and ARTnews magazines. For 2004–2005, he held the Amy Clampitt residency in Lenox, Massachusetts.  In 2005–2006, he lived in London, teaching a course for the Poetry School, and one for the Arvon Foundation at Totleigh Barton, Devon. In 2007 he directed a poetry-writing course at Wroxton College in Oxfordshire, and in 2008 he taught at the Almássera Vella Arts Center in Spain.  His first play, Lowell's Bedlam opened at Pentameters Theatre in London in 2011. He was a visiting fellow at Clare Hall, Cambridge in 2012 and after his residency was made a Life Fellow. In the same year, he published an e-book, Transatlantic Bridge: A Concise Guide to American and British English, detailing differences in vocabulary, pronunciation, grammar and punctuation.

Critical reception 

The critic Harold Bloom singled out Corn's All Roads at Once as the best first book of that year (The New Republic, 1976) and said in a jacket comment for A Call in the Midst of the Crowd:

“Alfred Corn’s second book of poems goes well beyond fulfilling the authentic promise of his first.  The title poem is an extraordinary and quite inevitable extension of the New York tradition of major visionary poems, which goes from Poe’s ‘City in the Sea’ and Whitman's ‘Crossing Brooklyn Ferry’ to Hart Crane's The Bridge and Ashbery's ‘Self Portrait in a Convex Mirror.’  Corn achieves an authority and resonance wholly worthy of his precursors.  I know of nothing else of such ambition and realized power in Corn's own generation of American poets.  He has had the skill and courage to confront, absorb, and renew our poetic tradition at its most vital.  His aesthetic prospects are remarkable, even in this crowded time.”

Bloom’s characterization of these books as belonging to the tradition of American Romanticism was a stimulus for much of the critical attention, positive or negative, focused on Corn during the following decades. Critics and poet-critics as diverse as Richard Howard, Charles Molesworth, Robert B. Shaw, Joel Conarroe, Jay Parini, John Hollander, Wayne Koestenbaum,  David Lehmann, Henry Louis Gates, Jr., Amy Clampitt, and Carolyn Forché, have made penetrating observations about his work.

Corn's work relative to other literary "schools" 

The New Princeton Encyclopedia of Poetry and Poetics (Princeton University Press, 1993) grouped Corn with poets who came to be known as the “New Formalists” (see New Formalism) but Corn has never appeared in the anthologies associated with this group. A noticeable percentage of his poetry uses meter, rhyme, and verseform, and he has written a widely circulated introduction to English-language prosody, The Poem’s Heartbeat.  The critic Robert K. Martin, in his The Homosexual Tradition in American Poetry (1979, revised 1998) placed Corn's poetry in a line that begins with Whitman and continues through Crane, Merrill, and Thom Gunn to the present; and Corn has appeared in several anthologies of gay poetry such as The World In Us (2000). But he has also appeared in more general anthologies such as The Norton Anthology of Poetry (Fourth and Fifth Edition, 1996 and 2005) and The Making Of a Poem (Mark Strand and Eavan Boland, 2000). Unusual for a poet, he has published two novels, the first, Part of His Story (favorably reviewed by critic A.O. Scott in The Nation) in 1997. His second, title Miranda's Book was published in the U.K. by Eyewear in 2014, and several short stories have appeared in magazines and anthologies.

Works 

All Roads at Once (1976) Viking Press 
A Call in the Midst of the Crowd: Poems (1978) Viking Press 
The Various Light (1980) Viking Press 
Notes from a Child of Paradise (1984) 
The West Door: Poems (1988) Viking Press 
The Metamorphoses of Metaphor: Essays in Poetry and Fiction (1987) Viking Press 
Incarnation: Contemporary Writers on the New Testament, editor and contributor (1990) Viking Press 
Autobiographies: Poems (1992) Viking Press 
Part of His Story: A Novel (1997) Mid-List Press 
Present (1997) Counterpoint 
The Poem's Heartbeat: A Manual of Prosody (1997) Story Line Press , (2008) Copper Canyon Press 
Stake: Selected Poems, 1972–1992 (1999) Counterpoint 
Contradictions: Poems (2002) Copper Canyon Press 
Transatlantic Bridge: A Concise Guide to American and British English (2012) thEbooks 
Tables (2013) Press 53 
Unions (2014) Barrow Street Press 
Miranda's Book (2014) Eyewear Publishing Ltd.
Rocinante (selected poems translated in Spanish) (2016) Chamán Ediciones, Spain 
Antonio en el desierto (selected poems translated into Spanish) (2017) El Tucán de Virginia, Mexico.
Arks & Covenants: Essays and Aphorisms (2017) Cat in the Sun Press 
The Bamboo Pavilion (2019) in collaboration with Joanne Wang, translations of classic Chinese poems, Four Seasons Press
 The Duino Elegies, Rainer Maria Rilke, translated by Alfred Corn (2021). W.W. Norton.
 The Returns: Collected Poems. 2022 Press 54.

References

External links 
alfredcorn.com
Alfred Corn's weblog
Alfred Corn at Academy of American Poets
Alfred Corn  at The New Georgia Encyclopedia
Alfred Corn (1943–) at Poetry Foundation
Alfred Corn Papers. Yale Collection of American Literature, Beinecke Rare Book and Manuscript Library.

1943 births
Living people
American male poets
Columbia Graduate School of Arts and Sciences alumni
Emory University alumni
Poets from New York (state)
People from Valdosta, Georgia
American LGBT poets
LGBT people from Georgia (U.S. state)
21st-century American LGBT people